The women's doubles tennis event was part of the tennis programme and took place between October 9 and 12, at the Geumjeong Tennis Stadium.

Chen Li and Li Fang from China were the defending champions, having won gold in Bangkok in 1998, but they didn't participate in Busan 2002. The Korean duo of Kim Mi-ok and Choi Young-ja won the gold in this tournament, with a three-set victory over Indonesia's Wynne Prakusya and Angelique Widjaja.

Schedule
All times are Korea Standard Time (UTC+09:00)

Results

References 

2002 Asian Games Official Report, Page 740
Draw

External links 
Official Website

Tennis at the 2002 Asian Games